The 2018 Southland Conference women's basketball tournament, a part of the 2017–18 NCAA Division I women's basketball season, took place March 8–11, 2018 at the Merrell Center in Katy, Texas. The winner of the tournament received the Southland Conference's automatic bid to the 2018 NCAA tournament.

Seeds and regular season standings
Only the top eight teams advanced to the Southland Conference tournament. This chart shows all the teams records and standings and explains why teams advanced to the conference tourney or finished in certain tiebreaking positions.

Schedule
Source:

Bracket

Awards and honors
Source: 
Tournament MVP: Cassidy Barrios, NichollsAll-Tournament Team:'''

 Cassidy Barrios, Nicholls
 Stevi Parker, Stephen F. Austin
 Chanell Hayes, Stephen F. Austin
 Tykeria Williams, Nicholls
 Imani Johnson, Stephen F. Austin

See also
2018 Southland Conference men's basketball tournament
Southland Conference women's basketball tournament

References

External links
 2018 Southland Conference Men's and Women's Tournament Page

Southland Conference women's basketball tournament
2017–18 Southland Conference women's basketball season
Southland Conference Women's basketball